Born Park (German: Bornpark) is public park in Osdorf, Hamburg, Germany. Located around Lake Helmuth Schack and the streams of Düpenau and Luruper Moorgraben, it is used as a recreational area mainly by the inhabitants of Osdorf, Osdorfer Born and nearby Schenefeld in Schleswig-Holstein.

History
In the area of Lake Helmuth Schack, parts of the moor area of Deesmoor, a glacial moor valley, was located until the 1960s. After a weir was constructed, the area filled with water and served as a retention bassin. A community of anglers cared for it. A public park was then developed around the lake. The first section of Born Park was opened on 9 October 1982, the final opening was on 20 June 1986.

Facilities
Within the park, a playground, a zone for dogs, a toboggan, a BMX track and the sports field "Kroonhorst" are located. At Lake Helmuth Schack, children and teenagers can borrow canoes and learn to paddle. An public outdoor pool is located in the Osdorfer Feldmark (Osdorf fields) south of the Bornpark. Before the construction of the outdoor pool, a bathing pond, the so-called "Born", was located there.

Reception
Die Tageszeitung wrote that the park as the green vicinity of Osdorfer Born helps to let the quarter appear "like an idyll".

References

buildings and structures in Altona, Hamburg
parks in Hamburg
tourist attractions in Hamburg